KAD or Kad may refer to:

 KAD, a Korean Adoptee
 Kathmandu Association of the Deaf
 Kad network, a file sharing network
 Kad (river), a river in Perm Krai, Russia